The Comptroller of the State of Maryland is Maryland's chief financial officer, elected by the people to a four-year term.  The Comptroller is not term-limited. The office was established by the second Maryland Constitution of 1851 due to concern about the potential for fraud and corruption in the administration of the public treasury. The constitutional duties of the office begin with the broad mandate to exercise "general superintendence of the fiscal affairs of the State", which includes collecting taxes and maintaining the general ledger. The Comptroller (or a deputy) countersigns all checks drawn by the State Treasurer upon the deposits of the State. The Comptroller also prescribes the formalities for transfer of other evidence of State debt and countersigns such papers.

In addition, the Comptroller's Office audits taxpayers for compliance, handles delinquent tax collection, and enforces license and unclaimed property laws. The agency publicizes forgotten bank accounts, insurance benefits and other unclaimed assets of taxpayers. Acting as Maryland's chief accountant, the Comptroller pays the state's bills, maintains its books, prepares financial reports, and pays its state employees.

List of Comptrollers of Maryland

References
List of Comptrollers of Maryland from the Maryland Archives

External links
Official website of the Comptroller of Maryland

 
1851 establishments in Maryland
Comptroller
Maryland